Abilene Independent School District is a public school district based in Abilene, Texas (USA).

The district serves the cities of Abilene and Impact in northeastern Taylor County as well as the portion of Abilene that lies in southeastern Jones County. As of the 2009-10 school year, AISD enrolled 17,016 students in 2 High Schools, 2 Magnet High Schools, 4 Middle Schools, 15 Elementary Schools and numerous special and alternative campuses. The district's enrollment peaked, for the time being, in the late 1990s and early part of the new century as development in south Abilene began to sprawl ever outward, spilling into neighboring Wylie ISD and Jim Ned CISD. As the city continues to age, school enrollment seems to have stabilized, for now, around 17,000.

Finances
As of the 2010-2011 school year, the appraised valuation of property in the district was $3,810,069,000. The maintenance tax rate was $0.104 and the bond tax rate was $0.012 per $100 of appraised valuation.

Academic achievement
In 2011, the school district was rated "academically acceptable" by the Texas Education Agency.  Forty-nine percent of districts in Texas in 2011 received the same rating. No state accountability ratings will be given to districts in 2012. A school district in Texas can receive one of four possible rankings from the Texas Education Agency: Exemplary (the highest possible ranking), Recognized, Academically Acceptable, and Academically Unacceptable (the lowest possible ranking).

Historical district TEA accountability ratings
2011: Academically Acceptable
2010: Academically Unacceptable
2009: Academically Acceptable
2008: Academically Acceptable
2007: Academically Acceptable
2006: Academically Acceptable
2005: Academically Acceptable
2004: Academically Acceptable

Schools

High Schools (Grades 9-12)
Abilene High School (Eagles) Opened 1888, current building Opened 1950s
2009 Gold Performance award - College Readiness: English & Language Arts
Cooper High School (Cougars) Opened 1960s
Holland Medical High School Opened 2007
Academy of Technology, Engineering, Math and Science (ATEMS) Opened 2009

Middle Schools (Grades 6-8)
Clack Middle School (Cardinals) Opened 1992
Feeds into Cooper High
2009 Recognized Campus
2009 Gold Performance awards - Reading, Social Studies
Madison Middle School (Bison) Opened 1961
Feeds into Cooper High
2009 Recognized Campus
2009 Gold Performance awards - Reading, Writing, Social Studies
Mann Middle School (Falcons) Opened 1961
Feeds into Abilene High
2009 Gold Performance award - Social Studies
Craig Middle School (Colts) Opened 2007
Feeds into Abilene High
2009 Recognized Campus
2009 Gold Performance awards - Reading, Writing, Social Studies

Former Middle Schools
Franklin Middle School (Broncos) [absorbed into Mann & Craig Middle School in 2007]
Lincoln Middle School (Longhorns) [consolidated into Craig Middle School in 2007]
Jefferson Middle School (Coyotes) [absorbed into Madison & Clack Middle Schools in 2004]

Elementary Schools (Grades K-5)
Austin Elementary School (Raiders) Opened 1959
Feeds into Mann MS & Madison MS
2009 Exemplary School
2009 Gold Performance awards - Reading, Math, Writing, Science
Bassetti Elementary School (Golden Bears) Opened 1992
Feeds into Clack MS
2006 National Blue Ribbon School
2009 Recognized Campus
2009 Gold Performance awards - Reading, Math, Science
Bonham Elementary School (Bulldogs) Opened 1953
Feeds into Craig MS & Clack MS
2009 Recognized Campus
2009 Gold Performance awards - Math, Writing, Science
Bowie Elementary School (Bobcats) Opened 1951
Feeds into Madison MS
2009 Exemplary Campus
2009 Gold Performance awards - Reading, Math, Writing, Science
Dyess Elementary School (Jets) Opened 1957
Feeds into Clack MS
2009 Exemplary Campus
2009 Gold Performance awards - Reading, Math, Writing, Science
Jackson Elementary School (Buffaloes) Opened 1962
Feeds into Madison
2009 Exemplary Campus
2009 Gold Performance award - Science
Johnston Elementary School (Jaguars)
Feeds into Craig MS & Mann MS
2009 Exemplary Campus
2009 Gold Performance awards - Writing, Science
Lee Elementary School (Lions) Opened 1961
Feeds into Mann MS & Clack MS
Long Elementary School (Longhorns)
Feeds into Mann MS
2009 Recognized Campus
2009 Gold Performance award - Science
Converted to an Early Childhood Center in 2017
Ortiz Elementary School (All-Stars) Opened 1992
Feeds into Mann MS
2009 Recognized Campus
2009 Gold Performance awards - Math, Writing
Reagan Elementary School (Rangers)
Feeds into Clack MS
Taylor Elementary School (Trojans)
Feeds into Craig MS
2009 Exemplary Campus
2009 Gold Performance awards - Writing, Science
Thomas Elementary School (Texans) Opened 1992
Feeds into Craig MS & Madison MS
2009 Exemplary Campus
2009 Gold Performance award - Science
Ward Elementary School (Wildcats) Opened 1992
Feeds into Clack MS & Madison MS
2009 Exemplary Campus
2009 Gold Performance awards - Reading, Math, Writing, Science

Former Elementary Schools
Central Elementary School [closed 1976] Lamar Elementary School [closed 1966]
Milam Elementary School [closed 1980]
Fair Park Elementary School [closed 1984]
Travis Elementary School [closed 1984]
Crockett Elementary School [closed 2002]
Jones Elementary School [closed 2002]
Valley View Elementary School [closed 2003]
Alta Vista Elementary School [closed 2003]
Fannin Elementary School [closed 2012]
College Heights Elementary School [closed 2012]
Long Elementary School [closed 2016]

Early Childhood Schools (Pre-Kindergarten)

Crockett Early Childhood
Long Early Childhood

Former Childhood Schools (Pre-Kindergarten)

Locust Early Childhood
Woodson Early Childhood
Woodson Early Headstart

Alternative Schools
Woodson Center for Excellence

See also

List of school districts in Texas
List of high schools in Texas
Susan King, former AISD trustee and current member of the Texas House of Representatives from District 71 in Abilene

References

External links

 
School districts in Taylor County, Texas
Educational institutions in the United States with year of establishment missing
School districts in Jones County, Texas
School districts in Abilene, Texas